Anamera gigantea is a species of beetle in the family Cerambycidae. It was described by Stephan von Breuning in 1935. It is known from Pakistan and India.

Subspecies
 Anamera gigantea gigantea Breuning, 1935
 Anamera gigantea iliyashenkoi Jiroux, Garreau & Gurko, 2012

References

Lamiini
Beetles described in 1935